Alejandro Tommasi (born Alejandro Casares Tommasi; August 14, 1957) is a Mexican television, stage and film actor.

Personal life
Tommasi is of Italian descent. Tommasi came out as gay and married his 35 years old boyfriend, Óscar Ruiz, in September 2011, after 10 years of relationship. In 2015 Tommasi filed for divorce from Ruiz due to abuse. One year later Tommasi proposed again to Ruiz in June 2016. On April 10, 2017 the couple got married in Las Vegas, United States.

Filmography

Television

Primetime series

Movies
 Cuando las cosas suceden as Sebastian Serratos (2007)
 Cementerio de papel (2007)
 Espinas as Huker (2005)
 Huapango as Otilio (2004)
 El Misterio de los almendros as Don Joaquin (2004)
 El Nahual (2004)
 Blind Heat as Mauricio (2002)
 Dark Cities (Ciudades oscuras) as Rubio (2002)
 Por la libre as Luis (2000)
 Sofia (2000)
 Si nos dejan (1999)
 Las Noches de aventurera as Bugambilia (1998)
 El Regreso del gato (1998)
 El Gato de la sierra (1997)
 Sobrenatural as Andres Berthier (1996)
 Coleccionistas as Orador (1996)
 La Crisalida (1996)
 Parabola (1995)
 Perfume, efecto inmediato (1994)
 Cita con la muerte as Rafael (1989)
 Zapata en Chinameca (1987)
 Rumbotica (1987)
 Te invitamos (1986)

Awards and nominations

TVyNovelas Awards

Premios Bravo

Premios El Heraldo de México

Premios Diosa de Plata

Premios de la Asociación de Cronistas y Periodistas Teatrales (ACPT)

Premios de la Agrupación de Periodistas Teatrales (APT)

Premios de la Asociación Mexicana de Críticos de Teatro (AMCT)

Premios Califa de Oro

References

External links
 Official Website
 

1957 births
Living people
Mexican male singers
Mexican male film actors
Mexican male stage actors
Mexican male telenovela actors
Mexican people of Italian descent
Male actors from Mexico City
Mexican gay actors
21st-century Mexican LGBT people